Savić, Sawicz, Савич, Савiч, Savic, Savich or Savitch is a Slavic surname, sometimes used as a first name, most common among South Slavs. It can be related to the name Sava or Sava (river).

Notable people with the surname include:



Savić 
Ana Savić (born 1989), former Croatian tennis player
Aleksandar Savić (1923–1941), Croatian Jewish communist and member of the resistance movement in Croatia 
Branko Savić (born 1972), retired Serbian football player
Darko Savić (born 1979), Serbian footballer
David Savić (born 1985), Serbian tennis coach and former professional tennis player
Dejan Savić (born 1975), Serbian water polo player
Dušan Savić (born 1955), Serbian former football player
Dušan Savić (footballer born 1985) (born 1985), Macedonian international footballer
Duško Savić, former Bosnian Serb association footballer
Gabrijel Savic Ra (1978), multimedia artist based in Belgrade
Ivan Savić (1949–2005), Croatian Franciscan Catholic priest
Jela Spiridonović-Savić (1891–1974), poet and wife of Vladislav Savić, the Consul general of Yugoslavia
Luka Savić (born 1991), Serbian footballer
Maja Savić (born 1976), handball player from Montenegro
Maja Savić (born 1979), Croatian Jazz singer
Marko Savić (pianist) (born 1941), Kosovo Serb pianist and university professor
Marko Savić (footballer) (born 1984), Serbian football striker
Massimo Savić (born 1962), Croatian singer
Michaela Savić (born 1991), Swedish beauty pageant titleholder and model
Milisav Savić (born 1945), Serbian writer
Miloš Savić (born 1987), Serbian bobsledder who has competed since 2009
Milunka Savić (1888–1973), Serbian woman war heroine from The First World War
Miroslav Savić (born 1973), Serbian footballer
Momir Savić (born 1951), Bosnian Serb paramilitary commander convicted for war crimes
Nenad Savić (born 1981), Serbian-born Swiss football player
Pavle Savić (1909–1994), Serbian physicist and chemist
Radmila Savić (born 1961), former Yugoslav handball player
Slobodan Savić (born 1964), journalist, writer, critic
Sonja Savić (1961–2008), cult Serbian actress, famous for her husky voice
Stefan Savić (born 1991), Montenegrin football defender
Tanja Savić (born 1985), Serbian folk singer
Vladan Savić (born 1979), Montenegrin footballer
Vujadin Savić (born 1990), Serbian football Central back, playing for Red Star Belgrade
Zoran Savić (born 1966), retired Serbian professional basketball player
Zoran Savić (soccer), retired Yugoslavian soccer forward

Savich 
Vsevolod Savich (1885–1972), Russian lichenologist
Zach Savich (born 1982), American poet

Savitch 
Jessica Savitch (1947–1983), American journalist
Mike Savitch (born 1973), bobsledder 
Walter Savitch (born 1943), American computer scientist

First name 
Savić Marković Štedimlija, Montenegrin-Croatian nationalist publicist and writer

Serbian surnames